Franklyn Ofori (born 23 February 1971) is a Ghanaian former professional tennis player.

Tennis career
Born in Accra, Ofori played collegiate tennis in the United States for California Baptist University, where he was twice named in the NAIA All-American first team. He was the 1992 winner of the NAIA's Ward-Ballinger Memorial Award.

During the 1990s he competed on the professional tour, reaching a best singles world ranking of 277. He was a quarter-finalist at the 1995 Singapore Challenger and appeared in qualifying at the Wimbledon Championships.

Ofori was member of the Ghana Davis Cup team between 1988 and 2001, appearing in a record 37 ties. He also holds the team records for most singles wins and doubles wins.

The tennis centre court at the Accra Sports Stadium was named after Ofori.

References

External links
 
 
 

1971 births
Living people
Ghanaian male tennis players
California Baptist Lancers athletes
College men's tennis players in the United States
African Games medalists in tennis
African Games silver medalists for Ghana
Competitors at the 1991 All-Africa Games
Sportspeople from Accra